Nicolas Calderón (born February 10, 1986 in Bogota) is a Colombian professional vert skater. Calderon started skating when he was twelve in 1998 and turned professional in 2010. His best trick is a McTwist 1080.

Vert competitions 
5th place World Roller Games Barcelona 2019  Pro Vert division
Performer in Abu Dhabi at the 40th anniversary of United Arab emirates spirit of the union show
2012 Indaiamonsters B.L.A.D.E. Brazil - Vert: 7th
2010 AIL World Championships Amateur. Tehachapi, CA. - Vert: 1st
 U.S.A. Halfpipe League 2016 Vert pro Contest 6th place - Las Vegas Nevada
 Playas Ecuador 2008 3rd place - park contest

External links

http://idrd.gov.co/contenidos/visualContenido.php?idContenido=2210
http://www.bogotacapitalextrema.com/inicio/index.php?option=com_content&view=article&id=45:historia-del-patinaje-extremo-en-colombia&catid=38:roller

Patinaje

1986 births
Living people
Vert skaters
X Games athletes